Lieutenant General Kamal Davar is a retired Indian military officer and security expert who served as the first director general of the Defense Intelligence Agency and deputy chief of the Integrated Defense Staff.

Early life and education

Davar is the son of veteran freedom fighter and Indian National Congress leader, Dr. M.C.Davar, a pacifist who had fought to prevent the partition of India. Kamal Davar is an alumnus of the National Defence Academy, Khadakvasala, and also holds an MSc in defence studies from Madras University, and a doctorate in security studies from Chaudhary Charan Singh University, Meerut.

Military career

Davar was commissioned into the 7th Light Cavalry regiment of the Indian Army. As a young officer, Davar participated in the 1965 India-Pakistan War during which he was wounded in action in the Lahore sector. Subsequently, he also participated in active operations during the 1971 Bangladesh Liberation War. He eventually rose to command the 86th Armoured Regiment of the Indian Army and also to serve on the Indian Military Training Team in Iraq. As a brigadier, He commanded the spearhead armoured brigade of the Army and subsequently was an instructor at the College of Combat (now the Army War College) as a major general, Davar was sent, the first armoured corps officer to command 3 Divisions responsible for the entire Ladakh sector. After 2 eventful years, he was posted as chief of staff at the corps headquarters in Nagrota, Jammu and Kashmir during the height of counter-insurgency operations. He subsequently rose to become general officer commanding of an army corps in Punjab, in the rank of lieutenant general. After completion of command as GOC of a corps, He was appointed director-general, Mechanised Forces at Army Headquarters in 2001. On 5 March 2002, the government announced Davar's appointment as the first chief of The Defence Intelligence Agency (DIA) and Deputy Chief of the Integrated Defence Staff. As the first chief of the DIA, he is reputed to have taken many pioneering intelligence initiatives both at home and abroad. General Davar has also served as the Colonel of the Regiment of 86 Armored Regiment, as well as that of 74th Armoured Regiment.

Environmentalism

Kamal Davar promoted the successful campaign to plant lakhs of trees in Punjab and clean the Harike Bird Sanctuary in Punjab. Following his retirement, he continued to promote environmental issues, encouraging local army units and schools to regularly plant trees. He is also an active and leading member of SPOKE (the Society for the Preservation of Kasauli and its Environs) and was nominated as its president.

Post retirement activities

Post-retirement, Davar has written regularly for the national media and military journals on security, counter-terrorism and intelligence issues. He has also spoken at various institutions, both in India and abroad, on security-related and geo-political subjects. Currently he is also the Conveyor of the Strategic Studies Cell, a think tank based in Kasauli, Himachal Pradesh in India. Gen Davar is also a member of the international High Level Military Group (HLMG) monitoring Israeli military operations in the Gaza Strip, West Bank and along the Israel-Lebanon border. Davar has been involved with Track II dialogues between India and Pakistan. Davar was recently nominated as the president of a new think tank established in the capital called The Delhi Forum For Strategic Studies (DFFSS). Davar has published books on the Pakistani state and Indian history.

References

Indian generals
Living people
Chaudhary Charan Singh University alumni
Year of birth missing (living people)